The  were a class of twenty-four destroyers of the Imperial Japanese Navy. The Fubuki class has been described as the world's first modern destroyer. The Fubuki class set a new standard not only for Japanese vessels, but for destroyers around the world. They remained formidable opponents to the end of World War II, despite being much older than many of their adversaries.

Background
As the treaty placed Japan in an inferior position relative to the United States and Great Britain in terms of capital ships, the obvious course of action would be to build large numbers of other types of ships not restricted by the treaty, with the most powerful weaponry possible. These destroyers were intended to operate with the new series of fast and powerful cruisers also under consideration as part of a program intended to give the Imperial Japanese Navy a qualitative edge with the world's most modern ships.

The resultant Fubuki class was ordered under the 1923 fiscal year budget, based on a smaller 1750 ton design, with ships completed between 1926 and 1931. Their performance was a great improvement over previous destroyer designs, so much so that they were designated . The large size, powerful engines, high speed, large radius of action, and unprecedented armament gave these destroyers the firepower similar to many light cruisers in other navies.

Design
The initial design for the Fubuki-class was based on a 2000-ton displacement hull with a single  battery, two twin 24-inch torpedo tubes (as introduced in ), and capable of 40 knots (74 km/h). Following the effective abandonment of the Washington Naval Treaty from 1923, the design was modified to 1680 standard tons with more guns and more torpedo tubes. However, their increased displacement more than offset their more powerful engines, resulting in a slower top speed than originally planned.

 
The S-shaped curved bow introduced on the Mutsuki class was retained; however, the well deck in front of the bridge was removed, which made it possible to extend the forecastle further aft and to flare the hull back to the first stack, which increased seaworthiness. The forecastle was also raised one deck in height to reduce the effect of heavy seas on the forward gun mount. The bridge enlarged and enclosed. The bow was given a significant flare, to offer protection against weather in the Pacific.

The Fubuki-class vessels were originally intended to have only hull numbers. This proved to be extremely unpopular with the crews and was a constant source of confusion in communications with the earlier  and es, and naval policy was changed in August 1928. Hence, the Fubuki-class vessels were assigned names as they were launched.

Between June 1928 and March 1933, twenty-four Fubuki-class destroyers were built. Several modifications took place throughout production, and the twenty-four units can be broken down into three groups. The final four ships were so different they were given a new class name. As completed, Fubuki had twin 5-inch guns in "A", "X", and "Y" positions, with triple torpedo tubes in "D", "P", and "Q", making them the most powerful destroyers in the world at the time of their completion.

Armament
The Fubuki-class destroyers were far more capable than the previous Mutsuki-class in armament. The main battery consisted of six Type 3 127 mm 50 caliber naval guns, mounted in pairs in three weather-proof, splinter-proof, gas-tight gun turrets that were far ahead of their time. The Group I vessels could elevate to over 40 degrees, but from Group II (the last 14 vessels of the series), these guns were dual-purpose guns that could be elevated to 70 degrees, making them the world's first destroyers with this ability. Ammunition was brought up on hoists from magazines located directly underneath each gun turret, which had a far greater rate of fire than those of other contemporary destroyers in which ammunition was typically manually loaded. However, the gun houses were not bullet-proof, and were thus actually still gun mounts, rather than proper turrets.

The three triple  torpedo launchers with Type 8 torpedoes which had proved successful on the Mutsuki-class was again used, and each tube had a reload, giving the destroyer a complement of 18 torpedoes in total. The forward launchers were located between the smokestacks.

Anti-aircraft capability was also as per the Mutsuki-Class, with two Type 92 7.7 mm anti-aircraft machine guns located in front of the second stack. These were replaced by Type 93 13 mm AA Guns before the start of the war. Following the start of then Pacific War, a number of units received an additional pair of Type 93 guns mounted in front of the bridge, which were later changed to Type 96 25mm AA Guns. In late 1943 to early 1944, one of the aft guns was replaced with two triple Type 96 guns, and an additional raised gun platform with another two triple Type 96 guns was added between the two aft torpedo launchers, In late 1944, the remaining units received more Type 96 guns as single mounts on the forecastle and stern.  received a Type 22 radar in November 1943, and the remaining seven units were so fitted in 1944. The few ships remaining in late 1944 also received the Type 13 radar.

Development

The first group, or Fubuki class, consisting of the first ten vessels completed in 1928 and 1929, were simpler in construction than the vessels that followed. They had a rangefinder on the compass bridge and an exposed gun-fire control room, and were equipped with a "Type A" gun turret that elevated both of its barrels at the same time and only to 40 degrees.

The second group, or Ayanami class, were built in 1930 and 1931, and had larger bridges that encompassed the rangefinder, an azimuth compass sighting device and the gun-fire control room, as well as a range finding tower. Furthermore, the boiler room's air inlet was changed from a pipe to a bowl shape. They also benefited from the deployment of "Type B" turrets, which could elevate each gun separately to 75° for AA use, making them the world's first destroyers with this capability.

These vessels had three larger boilers instead of the previous four and a narrower fore funnel. Improvements included a unique splinter-proof torpedo launcher-turret, which allowed the torpedo launcher tubes to be reloaded in action.

However, the Fubuki class also had a number of inherent design problems. The large amount of armament combined with a smaller hull displacement than in the original design created issues with stability. Despite design features intended to reduce weight, including use of welding on the hull and lighter alloys above the main deck, the ships exceeded their design weight by over 200 tons, which was even more of a problem with the Group II ships, with their larger bridge and heavier gun mounts. After the Tomozuru Incident, in which the top-heavy design of many Japanese warships called basic design issues into question, additional ballast had to be added.

In the Fourth Fleet Incident, during which a typhoon damaged virtually every ship in the Fourth Fleet, issues with the longitudinal strength of the Fubuki-class hull was discovered. As a result, all vessels were reconstructed between 1935 and 1937. An additional 40 tons of ballast was added, the bridge reduced in size and the height of the smoke stacks was decreased. The number of torpedo reloads were reduced from nine to three (for the center launcher only), and fewer shells were stored for the guns. The amount of fuel carried was also increased to help lower the center-of-gravity. Eight of the Ayanami class were retrofitted with the lighter "Type C" gun mounts, These changes increased the displacement to 2050 tons standard tons and over 2400 tons full load. The rebuild reduced the top speed slightly to 34 knots.

Operational history
Of the 24 Fubuki-class vessels completed, one was sunk in a collision in 1934. The remaining vessels served during the Pacific War.

Eight ships of the class were sunk by submarines, two by mines, the rest by air attacks. Only  and  survived the war. Hibiki was taken by the Soviet Navy as a prize of war, and continued to be used until 1964.

List of ships

Type I (Fubuki)

Type II (Ayanami)

Type III (Akatsuki)

References

Notes

Books

External links 

Destroyer classes
World War II destroyers of Japan